This is a listing of the fleets that participated in the Bombardment of Algiers on August 27, 1816.

Allies

British

Also the "Battering Flotilla", under the command of Capt. Frederick Thomas Michell, and comprising 55 vessels; gun-boats, mortar-boats, launches with carronades, rocket-boats, barges, and yawls.

Other British
Although James lists these three vessels as leaving England with the flotilla for Algiers, none actually served there.

Netherlands

Algiers

James mentions that a French frigate of 40 guns, named Ciotat, had warned the Algerines of the coming attack. However, there was no vessel by that name in the French Navy between 1786 and 1861. Other sources refer to Ciotat as a gabarre or a corvette, and make no mention of her being a man-of-war.

Citations

References
 Anon. "By a Friend of the National Maritime Museum" (1941) "The Battle of Algiers", Mariner's mirror (October 1941), Vol. 27, pp. 324–338.
 
 

Orders of battle
Barbary Wars